The Polar Music Prize (Often called the Noble Prize of Music) is a Swedish international award founded in 1989 by Stig Anderson, best known as the manager of the Swedish band ABBA, with a donation to the Royal Swedish Academy of Music. The award is annually given to one contemporary musician and one classical musician. Exceptions were made in 2001, when it was awarded to three musicians (one composer, one contemporary musician and one inventor), and 2003, when it was awarded only to one musician. Without any restrictions of nationality, the prize is to be "awarded for significant achievements in music and/or musical activity, or for achievements which are found to be of great potential importance for music or musical activity, and it shall be referable to all fields within or closely connected with music". The prize has been called the "Nobel Prize of Music" in Sweden.

The awards were first presented in 1992. The recipients were Sir Paul McCartney and the three Baltic States: Estonia, Latvia, Lithuania. Each of these four Laureates were awarded 1 million kr (approximately US$120,000 at 2016 rates, US$106,000 in 2019) presented by HM King Carl XVI Gustaf of Sweden at a ceremony at Stockholm Concert Hall in June every year. The Polar Music Prize is regarded as Sweden's foremost musical honour. The prize is overseen by the Stig Anderson Music Award Foundation, which includes members of Anderson's family and representatives of SKAP – the Swedish Society of Songwriters, Composers and Authors and the Swedish Performing Rights Society. A committee of musicians, other experienced members of the music industry, and members of Anderson's family selects the prize recipients from nominations submitted by representatives of several international music industry organizations, such as the European Composer and Songwriter Alliance. The prize amount is raised from revenue from the donation, while the ceremony is funded by sponsors. In June, 2018 it was reported by Swedish public service radio that the Polar Prize organization has made large financial losses for several years.

The current CEO of the Polar Music Prize is Marie Ledin. Prior CEOs include Stuart Ward and Hélène Carendi.

Laureates

References

External links 

 

International music awards
Awards established in 1992